The 2019 Nigerian House of Representatives elections in Taraba State was held on February 23, 2019, to elect members of the House of Representatives to represent Taraba State, Nigeria.

Overview

Summary

Results

Bali/Gassol 
A total of 7 candidates registered with the Uzo Independent National Electoral Commission to contest in the election. APC candidate Garba Hamman-Julde won the election, defeating PDP Adamu Maikarfi and 5 other party candidates. Hamman-Julde received 51.72% of the votes, while Maikarfi received 37.84%.

Jalingo/Yorro/Zing 
A total of 17 candidates registered with the Independent National Electoral Commission to contest in the election. APC candidate Aminu Ibrahim Malle won the election, defeating PDP Hassan Bappa and 15 other candidates. Malle received 45.25% of the votes, while Bappa received 38.01%.

Karim Lamido/Lau/Ardo-Kola 
A total of 12 candidates registered with the Independent National Electoral Commission to contest in the election. PDP candidate Danladi Baido won the election, defeating APC Bello Mohammed and 10 other party candidates. Baido received 51.78% of the votes, while Mohammed received 43.16%.

Sardauna/Gashaka/Kurmi 
A total of 11 candidates registered with the Independent National Electoral Commission to contest in the election. PDP candidate David Fuoh won the election, defeating APC Abdullateef Abubakar and 9 other candidates. Fuoh received 57.20% of the votes, while Abubakar received 40.97%.

Takuma/Donga/Ussa 
A total of 13 candidates registered with the Independent National Electoral Commission to contest in the election. PDP candidate Rima Kwewum won the election, defeating APC Alexander Atta and 11 other candidates. Kwewum received 62.43% of the votes, while Atta received 22.17%.

Wukari/Ibi 
A total of 20 candidates registered with the Independent National Electoral Commission to contest in the election. APGA candidate Usman Danjuma Shiddi won the election, defeating the PDP's Naphtali Kefas, AA's Yakubu Haruna Aliyara, and APC's Josiah Sabo Kente along with 16 other party candidates. Shiddi received 36.17% of the votes, while Kefas, Aliyara, and Kente received 22.61%, 20.38%, and 16.12%, respectively.

References 

Taraba State House of Representatives elections
House of Representatives
Taraba